Julie Smith is a British actress who is probably best known for her roles as Kate Ellis in the ITV soap Night and Day (2002–2003) and Lucy Day in Channel 5's Family Affairs (2002–2005). She has also appeared in a number of other television series, notably The Bill, Dream Team and Casualty. She has also appeared in several films including the 1998 drama I Want You and can also be seen in the video for Travis's 1999 single "Turn". She was nominated for an award at the 2003 British Soap Awards as sexiest female for her role as Lucy Day in Family Affairs.

She is sometimes credited as Julia Lee Smith.

Filmography 
 Agatha Christie's Poirot (1992)
 Boston Kickout (1995) – Mandy
 Chandler & Co (1995) – Kim
 Beautiful Thing (1996) – Gina
 Silent Witness (1996) – Sarah
 The Bill (1997) – Amy Massie
 Sex & Chocolate (1997) – Lauren
 No Child of Mine (1997) – Carly
 Made in Canada (1998)
 Casualty (1998) – Kelly
 Ultraviolet (1998) – Sal
 I Want You (1998)
 Dream Team (1998–1999) – Julie Alexander
 Angel in Training (1999)
 Attachments (2000) – Kerry
 The Bill (2000) – Lisa Harding
 Night and Day (2002–2003) – Kate Ellis
 Family Affairs (2002–2005) – Lucy Day
 The Golden Hour (2005) – Della Richards

External links 
 

British actresses
Living people
Year of birth missing (living people)